Stephanie Courtney (born February 8, 1970) is an American actress and comedian, best known for playing the advertising character Flo in television and radio commercials for Progressive Corporation beginning in 2008.

Courtney is also noted for her recurring roles on several television series, including the voices of Renee the Receptionist and Joy Peters on the Adult Swim comedy Tom Goes to the Mayor (2004–06), Marge on the AMC drama Mad Men (2007), and Diane on the ABC comedy Cavemen (2007). She also appeared in the season 2 premiere of Men of a Certain Age. She also plays Essie Karp in The Goldbergs. Courtney was a member of The Groundlings, an improvisational and sketch comedy theater in Los Angeles, California.

Early life and education

Courtney was born in Stony Point, Rockland County, New York, the youngest of three children of a high school history teacher father and a singer mother.  In 1992, she graduated with a degree in English from Binghamton University, where she played Elizabeth Proctor in The Crucible. By then, she said, "I was never tortured over whether I wanted to become an actress. There was never another option in my mind." After graduation, she moved to New York City, where her roommate was future author and columnist Meghan Daum. While working as evening secretary for Smith Barney chairman Robert F. Greenhill, Courtney studied acting at the Neighborhood Playhouse.

She moved to Los Angeles, where she roomed with her sister, actress Jennifer Courtney. The two wrote and performed the sketch "Those Courtney Girls" in Los Angeles and at the Aspen Comedy Festival. She joined the training program of the improvisational and sketch comedy group The Groundlings, and in 2004 became a member of its 30-person main company. There she met the theater's lighting director, Scott Kolanach, whom she married in 2008.

During her early time in Los Angeles she worked odd jobs, including catering, to support herself.

She has appeared in such films as The Brothers Solomon,  Blades of Glory, The Heartbreak Kid, Melvin Goes to Dinner, and Fred: The Movie.

Filmography

References

External links
 

Living people
1970 births
20th-century American actresses
21st-century American actresses
20th-century American comedians
21st-century American comedians
Actresses from New York (state)
American film actresses
American television actresses
American voice actresses
American women comedians
Binghamton University alumni
Comedians from New York (state)
Neighborhood Playhouse School of the Theatre alumni
People from Stony Point, New York